Archiplutodes is a genus of moths in the family Geometridae.

Species
 Archiplutodes prasina (Swinhoe, 1892)

References
 Archiplutodes at Markku Savela's Lepidoptera and Some Other Life Forms

Plutodini
Geometridae genera